Beroun is a town in the Central Bohemian Region of the Czech Republic. It has about 20,000 inhabitants. It lies at the confluence of the Berounka and Litavka rivers. Beroun creates a conurbation with Králův Dvůr, former part of Beroun. The town centre is well preserved and is protected by law as an urban monument zone.

Administrative parts
Beroun is made up of seven town parts: Beroun-Centrum, Beroun-Hostim, Beroun-Jarov, Beroun-Město, Beroun-Zavadilka, Beroun-Závodí and Beroun-Zdejcina.

Geography
It lies at the confluence of the Berounka and Litavka rivers, in the valley of the rivers. The surrounding landscape is hilly. The southern part of the municipal territory, including the built-up area, lies in the Hořovice Uplands. The northern part lies in the Křivoklát Highlands.

History

A settlement Na Brodě ("By the Ford"), predecessor of Beroun, was first mentioned in a 1088 deed. The first written mention of Beroun (under its Latin name Verona) is in a deed of Ottokar II of Bohemia from 1265. Ottokar II designated a strategically important place for the establishment of a settlement, from which the town of Beroun originated, that formed the shortest and easiest connection between Prague and Plzeň.

In 1295, Duke Wenceslaus II decided to re-settle and expand the town. At this time, the historic core of Beroun was created, which has been roughly preserved to this day. A Dominican convent was also founded.  In 1303, Wenceslaus II made Beroun a royal town.

During the reign of Emperor Charles IV, the town prospered and rapidly developed. In 1421, Hussite forces under the command of Jan Žižka stormed the town and demolished the Dominican convent, and though it was retaken and devastated after the Battle of Lipany, it has remained a mainly Czech settled town since then. During the reign of King Vladislaus II (1471–1516), Beroun reached its greatest prosperity.

Under the rule of the House of Habsburg from 1526, the town's estates were seized. During the Thirty Years' War it was sacked in turn by the Imperial army, Saxon forces, and Swedish forces. In the First Silesian War the same fate befell it at the hands of French and Bavarian troops.

In the 18th century, Beroun became a garrison town and did not prosper again until the 1860s, with the opening of limestone quarries and iron ore mines. Beside several ironworks, Beroun became the site of textile manufacturing, and the population increased.

Beroun was significantly transformed during communist rule. Heavy industry was expanded, and central government policy set quotas for new flats. As Beroun is situated between two rivers in a deep valley without suitable building plots, quotas were met by demolishing historical medieval buildings and erecting prefabricated high-rise buildings. The town look was changed again in the 1980s when the D5 highway was opened, running on the bridge above the town.

Králův Dvůr, together with multiple municipalities, was joined to Beroun in 1980. In 1990, Králův Dvůr and Trubín became separate municipalities.

Since the fall of communism, the town has been revitalised. Medieval buildings have been reconstructed, and town walls have been conserved. Heavy industry left the town, significantly raising the quality of living. In the 21st century, Beroun has become a popular place to live with high population growth and with an above-average quality of environment and health care.

Demographics

Transport
Beroun is connected via D5 motorway with Prague and German Bundesautobahn 6 to Nuremberg, part of the European route E50. 3rd Railway Corridor leads through the town.

Culture
The Talich's Beroun international music festival has been held annually in Beroun since 1983. It is named in honor of violinist Václav Talich, who lived and died in the town.

Sport
The town is represented by the ice hockey club HC Berounští Medvědi. The formerly 1st league club now plays in lower tiers. There is also the ball hockey club SK Kelti 2008.

The football clubs in the town are Český Lev Union Beroun and SK Cembrit Beroun-Závodí, both playing in lower amateur tiers.

The sports club TJ Lokomotiva Beroun is dedicated to swimming, rowing, athletics and other.

Sights

Husovo Square and its surrounding are the historic centre of Beroun. The square contains many valuable and well preserved houses. The town hall is a Renaissance building from 1560–1564.

The Church of Saint James the Great is as old as the town. It is one of the most valuable building in the town and a national cultural heritage. The Church of the Annunciation of the Virgin Mary was built in 1525, after a new cemetery was established during the great plague.

The Beroun walls are an exceptional monument of a medieval fortification in Bohemia. They were built during the reign of Wenceslaus II. Plzeňská Gate (also known as "Upper Gate") and Pražská Gate ("Lower Gate") were the most significant parts of town fortifications. Until 1842, the road from Plzeň to Prague passed through the gates.

In 1724, the Chapel of Our Lady of Sorrows was built.

Notable people

Josef Jungmann (1773–1847), poet and linguist; studied here
Karel Šimůnek (1869–1942), painter and illustrator
Václav Talich (1883–1961), conductor; lived and died here
Jiří Jeníček (1895–1963), photographer and filmmaker
Dolly Perutz (1908–1979), American sculptor and graphic artist
Ludmila Vachtová (1933–2020), art historian, critic and curator
Josef Jandač (born 1968), ice hockey player and coach
Leoš Mareš (born 1976), TV and radio presenter and singer
Martin Růžička (born 1985), ice hockey player
Tomáš Macháč (born 2000), tennis player

Twin towns – sister cities

Beroun is twinned with:
 Brzeg, Poland
 Goslar, Germany

See also
Beroun, Minnesota, an unincorporated community founded by immigrants from Beroun

References

External links

 

 
Cities and towns in the Czech Republic
Populated places in the Beroun District